Verdalsøra Chapel is a chapel of the Church of Norway in Verdal municipality in Trøndelag county, Norway. It is located in the town of Verdalsøra. It is one of the churches for the Stiklestad parish. The parish is part of the Stiklestad prosti (deanery) in the Diocese of Nidaros. The white brick and wood church was built in a rectangular style in 1969 using plans drawn up by the architect Torgeir Suul. The church seats about 200 people.

In 1993, the chapel was expanded by adding a church hall, kitchen, bathrooms, and office space.

Media gallery

See also
List of churches in Nidaros

References

Churches in Verdal
Churches in Trøndelag
Rectangular churches in Norway
Brick churches in Norway
Wooden churches in Norway
20th-century Church of Norway church buildings
Churches completed in 1969
1969 establishments in Norway